is a passenger railway station located in the city of Aki, Kōchi Prefecture, Japan. It is operated by the third-sector Tosa Kuroshio Railway with the station number "GN29".

Lines

Layout
The station consists of two opposed side platforms serving two elevated tracks. There is no station building and the station is unstaffed but both platforms are equipped with shelters comprising both an open and an enclosed compartment. Access to the two platforms is by separate flights of steps. Near the station entrance, another timber-built waiting room has been set up, together with a bike shed and parking lots for cars.

Adjacent stations

Station mascot
Each station on the Asa Line features a cartoon mascot character designed by Takashi Yanase, a local cartoonist from Kōchi Prefecture. The mascot for Ananai Station is a figure with an eggplant for a head named . The design is chosen because eggplant is a specialty product of the area.

History

Passenger statistics
In fiscal 2011, the station was used by an average of 8 passengers daily.

Surrounding area
Japan National Route 55

See also 
List of railway stations in Japan

References

External links

Railway stations in Kōchi Prefecture
Railway stations in Japan opened in 2002
Aki, Kōchi